Burr Oak may refer to:
Bur oak or Burr oak (Quercus macrocarpa), a species of North American oak tree
Burr Oak, Marshall County, Indiana
Burr Oak, Noble County, Indiana
Burr Oak, Iowa
Burr Oak, Kansas
Burr Oak, Michigan
Burr Oak Township, Michigan
Burr Oak, Missouri
Burr Oak, Ohio
Burr Oak, Wisconsin
Burr Oak Cemetery, a cemetery in Alsip, Illinois
Burr Oak Creek (disambiguation)
Burr Oak State Park, a park in Ohio